"Dynamite" is a song by British singer and songwriter Taio Cruz from the revised version of his second studio album, Rokstarr (2010). Cruz co-wrote the song, along with Max Martin, Bonnie McKee, Benny Blanco, and Dr. Luke; the latter two are also the producers. The song features additional instrumentation by Cruz himself. It was released internationally as the fourth single from Rokstarr. In the UK, the song was released as the first single from Cruz's compilation album, The Rokstarr Collection (2010). On 30 May 2010, it was released to US and Canadian radio stations as his second single and across Europe as his fourth single. An official remix was released featuring new label mate, Jennifer Lopez.

"Dynamite" became Cruz's second number-one single on the UK Singles Chart and the Canadian Hot 100 as well topping charts in Belgium, Luxembourg, Ireland, Australia and New Zealand. The song reached number two on the US Billboard Hot 100, and by January 2012 it had sold over 5.7 million copies in the U.S. and Canada, becoming the second best-selling song by a British artist in the digital era there, behind Adele's "Rolling in the Deep".

Composition
The song "Dynamite" is written in the key of C minor, with a tempo of 116 beats per minute. According to Cruz, "The song 'Dynamite' itself is about when you go to the club and when you go to a party and when you're just going out... you got to feel like, 'I'm just gonna explode.'" Dr. Luke and Max Martin had written the melody, and asked Bonnie McKee to write lyrics. McKee only met Cruz months after the song's release, and later said that "I thought ["Dynamite"] was the dumbest song I had ever written and thought it was going nowhere. And I actually think it was biggest song I have written so far."

Release and reception
The song was released in the UK on 23 August 2010. The song has met with mixed to positive reviews from contemporary music critics. While reviewing "Rokstarr", Jon Caramanica from The New York Times gave a mixed review, saying that the song has "vapid lyrics to navigate (e.g. "I hit the floor cause that's my plans, plans, plans, plans / I'm wearing all my favorite brands, brands, brands, brands") but they don't disrupt the mood, which is emphatic and rarely sensual".

Nick Levine from Digital Spy rated the song 4 out of 5 stars and gave it a positive review, naming it "a suitably Eurohousey club pumper" and saying that it's "essentially a cheap, tasty, and entirely satisfying banger". The New Yorker critic Sasha Frere-Jones named the song as his second favorite of 2010.

Chart performance
"Dynamite" debuted at number 26 on the Billboard Hot 100 and at number 13 on the Digital Songs chart, selling 83,000 copies in its opening week. The single rose to number 14 on the week ending 10 July 2010 and on the week ending 21 August 2010, the single climbed to a peak of #2, giving Cruz his second Top 3 single in the US.  The song kept this position for three consecutive weeks, blocked from the top position by Eminem's "Love the Way You Lie" featuring Rihanna. It also became Cruz's second consecutive number one single on Billboards Hot Dance Airplay chart in its 21 August 2010 issue. "Dynamite" charted on the Billboard Hot 100 for 47 weeks, making it the longest run for a single since Train's "Hey, Soul Sister", which stayed on that chart for 54 weeks. As of May 2012, it has sold over 6 million digital copies in the US alone. This marks the first song by a British act to reach this plateau, the twelfth song to do so, and only the second song to reach 6 million downloads without reaching number one (the first being Jason Mraz's "I'm Yours", which reached number six in September 2008).

The single debuted on the Canadian Hot 100 at number eight on the week ending 17 June 2010, marking Cruz's second Top 10 hit in the country. The following week the single fell to number nine, where it remained at for four consecutive weeks. On the week ending 18 September 2010, the song peaked at number one, becoming Cruz's second Canadian number one single, following "Break Your Heart"'s two-week stay at that position in May 2010. The song became the best-selling single in Canada during 2010 with sales of 319,000 copies.

On the chart dated 16 August 2010, "Dynamite" topped the New Zealand Singles Chart, and was certified gold, selling 7,500 copies. The song topped the Irish Singles Chart in its first week, becoming Cruz's first number one on that chart, following previous number two hit "Break Your Heart".

In Cruz's native United Kingdom, "Dynamite" charted at number one on the UK Singles Chart on 29 August 2010. This became his second number-one single in UK after "Break Your Heart". It knocked "Green Light" by Roll Deep off the summit, and was knocked off in turn by "Please Don't Let Me Go" by Olly Murs a week later.

Music video
The music video begins with a group of female mechanics working on cars at a garage. Cruz, wearing a red helmet, rides a silver motorbike towards the garage and stops by. As the music starts, he takes off his helmet and puts on his black sunglasses. He then kicks off a party, complete with a jacuzzi and fireworks. As the sun goes down and night falls, Cruz gives an impromptu concert of sorts with the mechanics as his audience. An enormous, fiery explosion then goes off behind Cruz, before subsiding into a shower of sparks.

Cruz has said that this is the perfect backdrop for the subtext of his song and that his inspiration came from "wanting to do things on a bike" since his previous videos included cars and boats. "So you're gonna see me spin the tyres on this, which is pretty cool!" One of the vehicles brought for the video shoot was a "massive truck" which was used to film big screen project Universal Soldier. Speaking of the shoot he said "I've never done a video that has this many props in it. We've got the most amazing, wrecked cars."

An official remix video was created by G-Pain which was published on September 11, 2022.

Live performances
Taio performed "Dynamite" for the first time on Live with Regis & Kelly on 9 June 2010. Later, he also performed on Jimmy Kimmel Live!, T4 on the Beach, America's Got Talent, GMTV, Dancing with the Stars, and on 31 December 2010, he performed the song on Dick Clark's New Year's Rockin' Eve with Ryan Seacrest.  On 12 August 2012, Cruz performed "Dynamite" at the 2012 Summer Olympics closing ceremony. He also performed it at grand launching of NET. TV in 2013.

Track listing
UK CD single and Digital download
"Dynamite" (Original Mix) – 3:24
"Dynamite" (Ralphi Rosario Club Remix) – 8:03
"Dynamite" (Mixin Marc Club Remix) – 5:34
"Dynamite" (StoneBridge Club Remix) – 7:20

German CD single
"Dynamite" – 3:24
"Dynamite" (Mixin Marc Radio Mix) – 3:34

Personnel
Songwriting – Lukasz Gottwald, Max Martin, Benjamin Levin, Bonnie McKee, Taio Cruz
Production, drums, keyboards and programming – Dr. Luke, Benny Blanco
Vocals and programming – Taio Cruz
Engineering – Emily Wright
Recording assistant – Tatiana Gottwald
Production coordination – Irene Richter, Vanessa Silberman, Megan Dennis
Mixing – Serban Ghenea
Mix engineering – John Hanes
Assistant mix engineering  – Tim Roberts
Mastering – Tom Coyne
Credits adapted from the liner notes of Rokstarr and Tidal.

Charts

Weekly charts

Year-end charts

Decade-end charts

All-time charts

Certifications and sales

Radio and release history

Radio adds

Purchaseable release

China Anne McClain version

"Dynamite" was covered by singer and actress China Anne McClain for the Disney Channel live-action series A.N.T. Farm. It started playing on Radio Disney on 3 May 2011 and was released for digital download on iTunes and Amazon on 26 July 2011 by Walt Disney Records. It is the second track on the series soundtrack of the same name, from which it also served as the lead single. The video of the song was released the same day as a digital download and also received frequent airplay on Disney Channel at the time of its debut on the network. McClain performed it as her lead role, Chyna Parks, in the series' pilot episode TransplANTed. McClain also had a live performance of this song live on 22 August 2011.

Music video
The music video for McClain's version of the song was aired on Disney Channel and uploaded on China Anne McClain's official VEVO channel on 3 May 2011. It shows McClain performing the song in an audition. It starts out slow and normal, which doesn't draw the judges' attention. However, afterward, she performs it with such passion and energy that it draws people into the auditorium, which was once empty aside from the panel of judges (composed of the other A.N.T. Farm cast members). The music video has over 90 million views on YouTube.

Charts

"TNT" by Jordan "CaptainSparklez" Maron 
On February 26, 2011, CaptainSparklez published a "Minecraft parody" of Dynamite, "TNT", with vocals from singer TryHardNinja, along with a music video. In late 2015, the video was made private at the request of Maron's network and replaced by a new video with original music. In May 2018, the original video was made public again. As of 2022, the video is currently the fourth-most-viewed video on Maron's channel with over 115 million views, surpassing the number of views of the original song.

See also
List of best-selling singles
List of best-selling singles in the United States
List of number-one singles of 2010 (Australia)
List of Canadian Hot 100 number-one singles of 2010
List of number-one singles of 2010 (Ireland)
List of number-one singles from the 2010s (New Zealand)
List of UK Singles Chart number ones of the 2010s
List of UK R&B Singles Chart number ones of 2010
List of Billboard Hot Dance Club Songs number ones of 2010
List of Billboard Mainstream Top 40 number-one songs of 2010

References

2010 singles
2011 singles
Taio Cruz songs
China Anne McClain songs
Canadian Hot 100 number-one singles
Irish Singles Chart number-one singles
Island Records singles
Number-one singles in Australia
Number-one singles in Scotland
Number-one singles in New Zealand
UK Singles Chart number-one singles
Songs written by Dr. Luke
Songs written by Benny Blanco
Songs written by Max Martin
Song recordings produced by Dr. Luke
Song recordings produced by Benny Blanco
Songs written by Taio Cruz
Songs written by Bonnie McKee
Walt Disney Records singles
2009 songs